Dalmiro Finol  (August 21, 1920 – May 16, 1994) was a Venezuelan professional baseball player. Finol batted and threw right-handed. He was born in Barrancas, Zulia State.

A versatile utility man, Finol was able to play all positions except pitcher and catcher, playing mainly at right field and first base. He also spent part of two seasons with the Gavilanes (1953–1954) and Magallanes (1955–1956) teams.

Although he never played in American baseball, Finol teamed with major league figures as Willard Brown, Alex Carrasquel, Chico Carrasquel, Wilmer Fields, Jim Pendleton and Len Yochim, among others.

As a rookie, he led the circuit with seven home runs, becoming the first player to win the league's home run title. In the midseason, he also became the first player to hit a grand slam in the league's history.

Finol later led the league with 35 RBI in the 1947–1948 season. His most productive effort came in the 1953–1954 tournament, when he posted career-highs in home runs (10), RBI (47) and games played (70). He also had two good seasons, hitting .320 in 1948–1949 and .365 in 1951–1952.

In an 11-season career, Finol batted a .278 average (475-for-1706) with 48 home runs and 296 RBI in 471 games, including 241 runs, 73 doubles, three triples, and 35 stolen bases.

Finol died in 1994 in Maracaibo, Zulia, at the age of 74.

Milestones
During the 1949 Caribbean Series Finol hit a home run off Cuban team pitcher Conrado Marrero, to become the first player ever to homer in the Series.
Was a member of the Venezuelan team who won the 1941 Baseball World Cup tournament.
In 2012 received the honor of induction into the Venezuelan Baseball Hall of Fame and Museum as part of their ninth class.

References

 Gutiérrez, Daniel. Enciclopedia del Béisbol en Venezuela – 1895-2006. Caracas, Venezuela: Impresión Arte, C.A., 2007.

External links

A history of Cuban Baseball
Latino Baseball
1941 BWC Championship
Pura Pelota – VPBL career statistics

1920 births
1994 deaths
Cervecería Caracas players
Gavilanes de Maracaibo players
Leones del Caracas players
Navegantes del Magallanes players
People from Zulia
Venezuelan baseball players